The 2010 Caribbean Championship is an international football tournament that will be held in Martinique from November 26 – December 5. The 8 national teams involved in the tournament are required to register a squad of 20 players; only players in these squads are eligible to take part in the tournament.

Before announcing their final squad for the tournament, teams are required to name a preliminary squad of 30 players by 16 November 2010, 10 days before the start of the tournament.

Number of caps, goals, players' club teams and players' age as of 26 November 2010.
Note: Caps and goals may be incomplete for certain players, therefore being inaccurate.

Group H

Trinidad and Tobago
Coach:  Russell Latapy

Note: Caps and goals may be incomplete for certain players, therefore being inaccurate.

Cuba
Coach:  Raúl González Triana

Note: Caps and goals may be incomplete for certain players, therefore being inaccurate.

Martinique
Coach:  Guy-Michel Nisas

Note: Caps and goals may be incomplete for certain players, therefore being inaccurate.

Grenada
Coach:  Franklyn Simpson

Note: Caps and goals may be incomplete for certain players, therefore being inaccurate.

Group I

Guyana
Coach:  Wayne Dover

Note: Caps and goals may be incomplete for certain players, therefore being inaccurate.

Guadeloupe
Coach:  Roger Salnot

Note: Caps and goals may be incomplete for certain players, therefore being inaccurate.

Jamaica
Coach:  Theodore Whitmore

Note: Caps and goals may be incomplete for certain players, therefore being inaccurate.

Antigua and Barbuda
Coach:  Rowan Benjamin

Note: Caps and goals may be incomplete for certain players, therefore being inaccurate.

References

Squads
Caribbean Cup squads